State Highway 53 (SH 53) is a New Zealand state highway linking  at Featherston with Martinborough. The highway is a 17.8 km long two lane carriageway and forms part of the Classic New Zealand Wine Trail.

Route
SH 53 commences from SH 2 at the intersection of Fitzherbert and Revans Streets, Featherston. It proceeds along Revans Street until the intersection with Boundary Road, at which point the highway takes the name State Highway 53. The highway crosses two major rivers: the Tauherenikau River near Featherston and the Ruamahanga River near Martinborough. West of the Ruamahanga crossing it has a TOTSO intersection with Bidwills Crossing Road, which links Martinborough with Greytown. When the highway reaches Martinborough State Highway 53 becomes known as Kitchener Street until it reaches its terminus at Memorial Square.

See also
List of New Zealand state highways

References

External links
 New Zealand Transport Agency

53
Transport in the Wellington Region